The fourth election to the Powys County Council following  local government reorganisation was held in May 2008. It was preceded by the 2004 election and followed by the 2012 election. The election resulted once again in a majority of Independent councillors

Results Overview
There was an Independent Majority.
 

|}

Ward Results (Brecknockshire)

Aber-craf (one seat)

Bronllys (one seat)

Builth (one seat)

Bwlch (one seat)

Crickhowell (one seat)

Cwmtwrch (one seat)

Felin-fach (one seat)

Gwernyfed (one seat)

Hay (one seat)

Llanafanfawr (one seat)

Llangattock (one seat)

Llangors (one seat)

Llangynidr (one seat)

Llanwrtyd Wells (one seat)

Maescar / Llywel (one seat)

St Davids Within (one seat)

St John (one seat)

St Mary (one seat)

Talgarth (one seat)

Talybont-on-Usk (one seat)

Tawe Uchaf (one seat)

Ynyscedwyn (one seat)

Yscir (one seat)

Ystradgynlais (two seats)

Ward Results (Montgomeryshire)

Banwy (one seat)

Berriew (one seat)

Blaen Hafren (one seat)

Caaersws (one seat)

Churchstoke (one seat)

Dolforwyn (one seat)

Forden (one seat)

Glantwymyn (one seat)

Guilsfield (one seat)

Kerry (one seat)

Llanbrynmair (one seat)

Llandinam (one seat)

Llandrinio (one seat)

Llandysilio (one seat)

Llanfair Caereinion (one seat)

Llanfihangel (one seat)

Llanfyllin (one seat)

Llanidloes (one seat)

Llanrhaeadr-ym-Mochnant / Llansilin (one seat)

Llansantffraid (one seat)

Llanwddyn (one seat)

Machynlleth (one seat)

Meifod (one seat)

Montgomery (one seat)

Newtown Central (one seat)

Newtown East (one seat)

Newtown Llanllwchaiaran North (one seat)

Newtown Llanllwchaiaran West

Newtown South (one seat)

Rhiwcynon (one seat)

Trewern (one seat)

Welshpool Castle (one seat)

Welshpool Gungrog (one seat)

Welshpool Llanerchyddol (one seat)

Ward Results (Radnorshire)

Beguildy (one seat)

Disserth and Trecoed (one seat)

Glasbury (one seat)

Knighton (one seat)

Llanbadarn Fawr (one seat)

Llandrindod East/West (one seat)

Llandrindod North (one seat)

Llandrindod South (one seat)

Llanelwedd (one seat)

Llangunllo (one seat)

Llanyre (one seat)

Nantmel (one seat)

Old Radnor (one seat)

Presteigne (one seat)

Rhayader (one seat)

By-Elections 2008-12

A number of by-elections were held during this period.

References

2008
Powys